Kanchi Mamunivar Government Institute for Post Graduate Studies And Research, is a postgraduate degree college located in Lawspet, Puducherry. It was established in the year 1989. The college is affiliated with Pondicherry University. This college offers postgraduate courses in arts, commerce and science.

Departments

Science
Physics
Chemistry
Mathematics
Plant Biology and Biotechnology
Zoology
Computer Science

Arts and Commerce
Tamil
English
French
History
Economics
Commerce

Accreditation
The college is  recognized by the University Grants Commission (UGC).

References

External links
 Kanchi Mamunivar Government Institute for Post graduate Studies and Research(KMGIPSR), Puducherry Official website

Universities and colleges in Puducherry
Educational institutions established in 1989
1989 establishments in Pondicherry
Colleges affiliated to Pondicherry University